Auguste Hauschner (née Sobotka; February 12, 1850 —  April 10, 1924) was a German writer. She also published under the pseudonym of Auguste Montag. She is considered as an important representative of German-speaking authors in Prague. In her work, she repeatedly pointed out socially critical issues.

Life 
Auguste Sobotka was born on February 12, 1850, in Prague, Czech Republic, and grew up there. She was the daughter of a merchant with Jewish roots. At the age of 14, Sobotka moved to Berlin, Germany, and attended the Jesenius boarding school for four years. In 1871, she returned to Prague and married painter and manufacturer Benno Hauschner. In the mid 1870s, she moved back to Berlin with her husband. Benno Hauschner died in 1890. Their apartment in the Tiergarten district developed in the following years into a salon for Berlin artists. In addition to her cousin Fritz Mauthner, with whom she was in close correspondence, Gustav Landauer, Maximilian Harden, Max Liebermann and Max Brod also frequented her Berlin salon.

Auguste Hauschner began her literary work in the 1880s. She penned numerous short stories and novels in which she was one of the first women writers to deal with the questions of the social position of women, and deal with questions of Jewish identity. Her most important work is the novel Die Familie Lowositz (1908, two volumes), which was followed by Rudolf and Camilla in 1910. In it she draws an (autobiographical) study of the milieu of the German-Jewish upper middle class in Prague and Berlin. She also was a promoter of socialist, anarchist and feminist actors and projects.

Work 
Auguste Hauschner has produced a total of 35 works in 110 publications and has 323 library holdings. Here are some widely held works by Auguste Hauschner:

 Daatjes Hochzeit; Novelle, 1902
 Kunst : Roman, 1904
 Zwischen den Zeiten, 1906
 Zwischen den Zeiten, 1906
 Die Familie Lowositz, 1908 
Die große Pantomine Roman, 1913 
 Der Tod des Löwen, 1916
 Die Siedelung : Roman, 1918
Der Versöhnungstag Novelle, 1919
 Nachtgespräche, 1919
 Die Heilung, 1921
Die Heilung Roman, 1922

Literature 

 
 Hella-Sabrina Lange: "We are all standing between two times". On the work of the writer Auguste Hauschner (1850-1924). Essen: Klartext 2006. (= Düsseldorfer Schriften zur Literatur- und Kulturwissenschaft. 1.) . Inhaltsangabe der DNB 
 Andreas B. Kilcher (Hrsg.): Lexicon of German-Jewish Literature. Stuttgart 2000: JBMetzler / Poeschel Verlag
 Hauschner, Auguste. In: Lexikon deutsch-jüdischer Autoren. Volume 10: Güde – Hein. Edited by the Bibliographia Judaica archive. Saur, Munich 2002, S. 248–262.
 Veronika Jičínská: Bohemian themes with Fritz Mauthner and Auguste Hauschner . Czech Republic / Ústí nad Labem 2014, (= Acta Universitatis Purkynianae, Facultatis Philosophicae Studia Germanica, Series Monographica 3) 
 Birgit Seemann: “One human race above all peoples” - Auguste Hauschner, writer between Prague and Berlin. In: Renate Heuer (ed.): Hidden readings: new interpretations of Jewish-German texts from Heine to Rosenzweig; in memory of Norbert Altenhofer . Frankfurt am Main: Campus, 2003   S. 187–203.
 Jana Mikota: Jewish women writers - rediscovered: Auguste Hauschner . In: Medaon 3 (2009), 5 (online).

Further reading 

 Literature by and about Auguste Hauschner in the catalog of the German National Library
 "Auguste Hauschner, the great-grandmother of Prague German literature" , essay by literary scholar Ingeborg Fiala-Fürst
 "Auguste Hauschner" , contemporary appreciation of Oskar Walzel in the Berliner Tageblatt of November 15, 1919

References 

1850 births
1924 deaths
People from Prague
19th-century German women writers
19th-century women writers
19th-century novelists